Sivaladapinae is a subfamily of adapiform primate that lived in Asia during the middle to late Miocene.

References

Literature cited

 

Prehistoric strepsirrhines
Miocene mammals of Asia
Fossil taxa described in 1979
Miocene first appearances
Miocene extinctions
Mammal subfamilies